Eolampra gorgia is a fossil species of beetles in the family Buprestidae, the only species in the genus Eolampra.

Its average body measurement is 31.4 x 11.4 and age range is 15.97 to 11.608 Ma.

References

Monotypic Buprestidae genera